Muhammad Tariq Tarar (Urdu: ًمحمد طارق تارڑ) (born 13 May 1961) is a Pakistani legislator and a former Member of the National Assembly of Pakistan  from Constituency NA-108 for the Pakistan Peoples Party. He was also a member of the Provincial Assembly of the Punjab from August 2018 to January 2023. He is from the village of Raike, Phalia, District Mandi Bahauddin, Punjab.

Career
Tarar participated in all General Elections from 1990 until 2013. He lost his first General Election in 1990 against Pir Syed Mohammad Yaqoob Shah. In 1993 he was elected as a Member of Provincial Assembly, staying until 1996. In 2008 Tarar was re-elected Member of the National Assembly. He was Parliamentary Secretary of the Ministry of Environment from March 2009 – July 2011, and has been Federal Parliamentary Secretary for the [[Ministry of Information and Broadcasting (Pakistan)|Ministry of Information and Broadcast|archive-date=4 September 2012 |url-status=dead }}</ref>

He lost his seat during 2013 General Elections and came third with 13% of votes

References

External links
 Government Official Website National Assembly of Pakistan

Phalia
Living people
1961 births
Pakistan People's Party politicians
Punjab MPAs 2018–2023
Pakistani MNAs 2008–2013